CARE UK may refer to

 The UK branch of the international relief agency CARE
 Care UK, a UK provider of health and social care
 Christian Action Research and Education, a UK pressure group